Janin Ullmann ( Reinhardt; born 14 November 1981) is a German television presenter and actress.

Career
Ullmann participated in a casting of the German music channel VIVA. She was chosen from 3,000 participants and became the host of Interaktiv. Since then, she hosted several television shows, such as Inside, Film ab, Star Search – Das Magazin, Top of the Pops, Bravo Super Show, the Bundesvision Song Contest 2006 (with Stefan Raab), and several TV total specials.

Acting
Ullmann acted in Was nicht passt, wird passend gemacht, short film Mittsommer (2005) at Internationale Filmschule Köln, comedy show PAARE on Sat.1, twice in Die ProSieben Märchenstunde as Rapunzel, and played the lead role in the supernatural horror film Die Bienen – Tödliche Bedrohung.

Ullmann is known for her performance as Lotta and Alex in the telenovela Lotta in Love.

Personal life
Ullmann was married to German actor Kostja Ullmann, whom she began dating in 2008. Based on her individual-feminist attitude, she founded the podcast Female Finance in 2022, which campaigns for women's financial independence.

References

External links 

 
 Agency of Janin Ullmann
 
 Janin Ullmann at crew-united.com
 Interview with Janin Reinhardt: "Claudia Schiffer kann halt nicht jeder werden" (17 November 2001, sbznet.de) (in German)

1981 births
German film actresses
German television actresses
Living people
Actors from Erfurt
German television presenters
21st-century German actresses
Bundesvision Song Contest
German women television presenters
Norddeutscher Rundfunk people
Mass media people from Erfurt
Individualist feminists